Bears Island is a small island with an area of 0.34 ha, lying off the north-west tip of Three Hummock Island in Bass Strait, south-eastern Australia.  It is part of Tasmania’s Hunter Island Group which lies between north-west Tasmania and King Island.

Fauna
Breeding seabirds and shorebirds include little penguin, common diving-petrel, Pacific gull and sooty oystercatcher.

References

Islands of Bass Strait